The National University of Tainan (NUTN) is a university in West Central District, Tainan, Taiwan. 

NUTN offers a wide range of undergraduate and graduate programs across six colleges: the College of Education, the College of Humanities and Social Sciences, the College of Management, the College of Science and Technology, the College of Arts, and the College of Indigenous Studies.

The university has several research institutes and centers, including the Center for Teacher Education and Professional Development, the Center for International Studies, and the Center for Sustainable Development.

History
NUTN was founded during the Japanese rule as Tainan Normal School in June 1899. In January 1946, after handover to the Republic of China, the school was renamed Taiwan Provincial Tainan Normal School. In August 1962, the school was promoted to Taiwan Provincial Tainan Junior Teachers’ College. The college was then promoted to Taiwan Provincial Tainan Teachers’ College in July 1987. In July 1991, it was then again promoted as National Tainan Teachers’ College. In August 2004, the college was promoted and renamed National University of Tainan.

Academics
NUTN has six colleges: Education, Humanities, Science and Engineering, Environmental Sciences and Ecology, Arts and Management.

Museums
 Bo Yang Museum 
 Shiang Yu Museum

Transportation
The university is accessible within walking distance from the Tainan Station of the Taiwan Railways.

Notable alumni
 Tu Cheng-sheng, Minister of Education (2004-2008)

See also
 Education in Taiwan
 List of universities in Taiwan

References

External links 

 

1898 establishments in Taiwan
Educational institutions established in 1898
Universities and colleges in Tainan
Technical universities and colleges in Taiwan
Teachers colleges